The Vermont State Auditor of Accounts is one of six constitutional officers in Vermont, elected statewide every two years. The Office provides an independent and objective assessment of Vermont's governmental operations.

The current Auditor is  Douglas R. Hoffer, a Democrat/Progressive. He was first elected to office in 2012.

Until 1870, Vermont elected their Auditor of Accounts for one-year terms.

Former Vermont Auditors

Notes

External links 
 Vermont State Auditor of Accounts
 Government of Vermont portal

 
Vermont